Georgije Ilić (born 13 May 1995) is a Serbian footballer who plays for Radnički Sremska Mitrovica.

Youth years
Ilić is a product of FK Vojvodina's youth academy. He was the member of the youth squad that won two successive youth league titles.

Club career

Vojvodina
On April 13, 2013, Ilić made his first-team debut, under coach Nebojša Vignjević, in a 2:2 home draw with Sloboda Užice.

References

External links

Serbian footballers
FK Vojvodina players
FK Napredak Kruševac players
FK Radnički 1923 players
FK Cement Beočin players
FK ČSK Čelarevo players
FK Rad players
Serbian First League players
Serbian SuperLiga players
Association football midfielders
1995 births
Living people
People from Ruma